The Louisiana Ragin' Cajuns men's basketball program represents intercollegiate men's basketball at the University of Louisiana at Lafayette. The school competes in the Sun Belt Conference in Division I of the National Collegiate Athletic Association (NCAA) and play home games at the Cajundome in Lafayette, Louisiana. Bob Marlin is in his thirteenth season as head coach. Louisiana has appeared in the NCAA tournament eleven times, most recently in 2023. The Ragin' Cajuns have won the Sun Belt Conference tournament title seven times.

History

Conference affiliations
1914–15 to 1924–25: Louisiana Intercollegiate Athletic Association
1925–26 to 1940–41: Southern Intercollegiate Athletic Association
1941–42 to 1946–47: Louisiana Intercollegiate Conference
1947–48 to 1970–71: Gulf States Conference
1971–72 to 1972–73; 1975–76 to 1981–82: Southland Conference
1982–83 to 1986–87: NCAA Division I Independent
1987–88 to 1990–91: American South Conference 
1991–92 to present: Sun Belt Conference

NCAA sanctions

1968 infractions
In 1968, Southwestern Louisiana was placed on two years' probation and barred from postseason play during that time for recruiting violations and for student-athletes receiving financial assistance from an outside organization.

1973 death penalty
In August 1973, Louisiana—then known as Southwestern Louisiana—became only the second school to receive the so-called "death penalty" from the NCAA.  The basketball team was found guilty of over 120 violations. Most of them involved small cash payments to players, letting players borrow coaches' and boosters' cars, letting players use university credit cards to buy gas and buying clothes and other objects for players. However, the most severe violations involved massive academic fraud.  In the most egregious case, an assistant coach altered a recruit's high school transcript and forged the principal's signature.  Several boosters arranged for surrogates to take college entrance exams for prospective recruits. The NCAA Council found the violations so egregious that it wanted to throw Southwestern Louisiana out of the NCAA altogether. It settled for scrubbing the Ragin' Cajuns' 1972 and 1973 NCAA Tournament appearances from the books canceling the 1973–74 and 1974–75 seasons, and stripping the school of its vote at the NCAA convention for three years.

2007 major violations
In 2007, The Ragin Cajuns were found guilty of major violations in its men's basketball program. An NCAA investigation found that now-former player Orien Greene had relied on 15 hours of correspondence courses taken through another institution in order to remain eligible for the 2004 spring semester and the entire 2004–05 academic year. NCAA rules do not allow student-athletes to use correspondence courses taken from another institution to remain eligible.  According to the NCAA, this was an "obvious error" that should have been caught right away, but the school's then-compliance coordinator, director of academic services and registrar all failed to catch it.  When school officials learned about the violations, they vacated every game in which Greene participated—43 games in all, including NCAA tournament appearances in 2004 and 2005—and scrubbed Greene's records from the books.  The NCAA accepted Louisiana's penalties and also imposed two years' probation.

Postseason

NCAA Division I Tournament results
The Ragin Cajuns have unofficially appeared in 10 NCAA Division I Tournaments.  However, they have officially only appeared in six; the other four appearances have been vacated. In 1972, they became the first school to make the tournament in their first year of eligibility, advancing to the Sweet Sixteen. They repeated this feat in 1973. However, both of these appearances were vacated as a result of the 1973 infractions case. The Ragin Cajuns participated in the 2004 and 2005 NCAA tournaments, but both appearances were vacated due to major violations involving Orien Greene. Their official combined record is 1–6. All appearances prior to 2000 were when the school was still named Southwestern Louisiana.

* appearance and records vacated

NCAA Division II Tournament results
The Ragin Cajuns appeared in the 1971 NCAA Division II Tournament. However, that appearance was later vacated due to the same rules violations that stripped them of their 1972 and 1973 Division I Tournament results.

* appearance and records vacated

NAIA Tournament results
The Ragin Cajuns appeared in two NAIA Tournaments. Their combined record is 3–2.

NIT results
The Ragin Cajuns appeared in six National Invitation Tournaments. Their combined record is 6–7. All appearances prior to 2002 were when the school was still named Southwestern Louisiana.

CIT results
The Ragin Cajuns appeared in three CollegeInsider.com Tournaments (CIT). Their combined record is 4–3.

Home venues

Earl K. Long Gymnasium

Blackham Coliseum

Cajundome

Notable players

Dwight "Bo" Lamar, former player for San Diego Conquistadors, Indiana Pacers, and Los Angeles Lakers. NCAA Scoring Title in 1972, Two Time All-American (1972, 1973)
Andrew Toney, former player for the Philadelphia 76ers and two-time NBA All-Star
Elfrid Payton, former player of the Phoenix Suns, Lefty Driesell Award winner in 2014
Frank Bartley (born 1994), basketball player for Ironi Ness Ziona of the Israeli Basketball Premier League
Johnathan Stove (born 1995), basketball player for Hapoel Galil Elyon of the Israeli Basketball Premier League
Bryce Washington (born 1996), basketball player in the Israeli Basketball Premier League

See also
List of NCAA Division I men's basketball programs
2020–21 Louisiana Ragin' Cajuns women's basketball team

References

External links